Neil Ryan Sese (born April 26, 1979) is a Filipino actor. He is currently working as an exclusive talent of GMA Network. Sese is best known for portraying Asval in the 2016 version of Encantadia.

Background
Neil Ryan Sese was only seven years old when his parents separated. His father, a radiologist from Masbate, left their home and he never saw him again.

An only child, he grew up in Lucena City, Quezon, where his mother, Rosalyn Sese, took charge of his upbringing, enrolled him at Maryhill Academy. In 1993, he wanted to study at the University of Santo Tomas to be with his peers but his mother told him to enroll at the University of the Philippines. So he took a nonquota course entrance exam. The first year was devoted to general subjects like mathematics, but he soon found himself auditioning and appearing in Dulaang UP plays.

By the second year, he was enjoying being a campus actor, appearing in classic plays like Oedipus Rex and learning a lot from mentors like director Tony Mabesa and actor Rey Ventura. He dropped his plan to take up Mass communication major in Theatre Arts. He has been at it ever since. He appeared in both classics and Asian dramas such as St. Louis Loves Dem Filipinos, Hudhud, Kanjincho, Sepharad: Voces de Exilio, Basilia Ng Malolos, Sa Ngalan Ng Anak, etc.

In 2011, he played the role of Simeon in the highly successful TV drama series, Munting Heredera which he considered as his biggest break ever. His career is currently handling by an award-winning director/manager Maryo J. de los Reyes. The same year, he signed a three-year exclusive contract with GMA Network. His first project as an exclusive talent of the network was the series Biritera where he played one of the lead roles.

Sese is also a favorite of indie film directors, landing choice roles in acclaimed movies like Ang Pagdadalaga ni Maximo Oliveros, Mangatyanan, Sanglaan and Huling Pasada. In Huling Pasada, he was nominated for Best Actor by the respected critics but lost to Ronnie Lazaro.

In Amphitryon, a Dulaang UP production directed by Jose Estrella, he displayed a comedic side. He played Stanley Kowalski in Tanghalang Pilipino's Flores Para los Muertos (a translation of Tennessee Williams' A Streetcar Named Desire), directed by Floy Quintos.

Filmography

Television

Film
Note: Both mainstream and independent films

 Caregiver (Norman)
 Aishete Masu (Hiroshi)
 Beautiful Life (Matsumoto)
 Here Comes The Bride (Inyaki's dad)
 Gatas Sa Dibdib Ng Kaaway (Interpreter)
 Noy (Policeman)
 Paano Na Kaya?
 Shake, Rattle & Roll XI
 Sukob (Michael)
 Kutob (Philip)
 Matakot Ka Sa Karma (Poldo)
 Malikmata (Medium)
 Filipinas (Rex)
 Ang Pagdadalaga ni Maximo Oliveros (Boy)
 Kubrador
 Seroks
 Huling Pasada
 Mangatyanan (Eric)
 Buenavista
 Sanglaan (Henry)
 Hawang
 Graveyard Shift
 Layang Bilanggo (Sgt. Sese)
 Tsardyer (Ahmad)
 ID (Bimbo)
 Colorum (Policeman)
 Kamoteng Kahoy
 Haw-Ang
 Mark, Matthew, Luke and John
 My Little Bossings
 La Amigas (Hostage Taker)
 Seklusyon

References

External links

https://www.gmanetwork.com/sparkle/artists/neilryansese

Filipino male television actors
Filipino male film actors
21st-century Filipino male actors
Filipino television personalities
1979 births
Living people
People from Lucena, Philippines
Male actors from Quezon
ABS-CBN personalities
GMA Network personalities